Enfield House is a Grade II* listed building at 18 Low Pavement, Nottingham.

History

The house was occupied by Mr. Stockdale in 1743 and he may have been responsible for the current frontage of Enfield House which was erected ca. 1755 and was probably a refacing of an existing building. It is noted for its fine Venetian windows. The rear facade of the house is thought to have been built in 1760. The building contains cellars with brick vaults, wine bins and thrawls, cut from the rock on two levels linked by a winder stair. The house became known as Enfield House after it was lived in by Henry Enfield from 1815, town clerk from 1816 to 1845. After his death, other members of the Enfield family continued to live there and eventually it became the business premises of Henry Houghton Enfield, solicitor until 1934.

References

Grade II* listed buildings in Nottinghamshire
Buildings and structures in Nottingham
Buildings and structures completed in the 1750s